The Billboard Rhythmic chart debuted in the issue dated October 3, 1992, as the Top 40/Rhythm-Crossover chart, alongside the Top 40/Mainstream chart (now called Mainstream Top 40). Weekly rankings are "compiled from a national sample of airplay" as measured by Nielsen BDS monitoring rhythmic radios stations continuously. The first number-one song on both charts was "End of the Road" by Boyz II Men.

On June 25, 1997, the chart was renamed to Rhythmic Top 40 as a way to distinguish stations that continued to play a broad based rhythmic mix from those whose mix leaned heavily toward R&B and hip-hop. Prior to the Billboard Hot 100 becoming an all-genre songs chart in December 1998, the Rhythmic Top 40's panel of radio stations monitored by BDS made up one portion of stations measured towards the airplay component of the Hot 100 (alongside Mainstream Top 40, Adult Top 40, Adult Contemporary, and Modern Rock stations).

Below are the songs that reached number one on the chart from its inception to the end of 1999 in chronological order.

Number-one rhythmic hits of the 1990s

See also
1990s in music
List of Billboard Hot 100 number-one singles of the 1990s
List of artists who reached number one on the U.S. Rhythmic chart

References

Lists of number-one songs in the United States
United States Rhythmic